Gn15 is a rail modelling scale, using G scale 1:22.5 scale trains running on H0/00 gauge track, representing minimum gauge and miniature railways. Typical models built are between 1:20.3 and 1:24, or up to 1:29.

 NEM 010 specification defines IIp for modelling  gauge.

History
Gn15 modeling is a relatively new phenomenon in the model railroading world.  While the idea of this scale has existed for some time, as evidenced by the early efforts of Marc Horovitz, editor of Garden Railways magazine, Gn15 did not gain any measure of popularity until the Sidelines range of models.  Following the advent of these kits, a few other lines of kits became available.

Initial community development took place on Yahoo email groups, but these have been superseded by the forums at Gn15.info as the primary form of communication between the far flung practitioners of this scale.

09, GNine and related scales
Alongside Gn15 other modeling scales have developed to cover both the modelling of minimum gauge lines in scales smaller than G, and 'miniature' lines (less than ) in G scale.

O9 or On15 is the use of N gauge track in 7mm scale to represent a  'minimum gauge' line. In comparison, GNine is the use of 9mm track to represent 'miniature' lines. GNine is a 'flexible' term for scale, referring to modelling using garden railway scales and N gauge track.  GNine models can be built to scales between 7/8" and 1:35 representing anything between  gauge and  miniature railways.

References

External links

Forums
Gn15.info - The center of the Gn15 internet community
The Gnatterbox - Gn15.info's very active forum

Gn15 Suppliers
Pepper7 - Home to the Sidelines range or locos, cars, and details
Schomberg Scale Models - Has a line of Gn15 items based on 'Winky', a peat hauling line in Canada
Tom Yorke Studios - producing a number of Gn15 models
Smallbrook Studio - produces a range of GN15 models based on both Sir Arthur Heywood prototypes and Rowland Emett cartoons
Scott Buschlen (Ontario) now has Listers available via Gn15.info.

Trackplans
Micro Layouts for Model Railroads - Dedicated to layout planning in less , many of the plans here are in Gn15

Model railroad scales
Scale model scales
Narrow gauge railway modelling